John W. Kluge Jr. (born 1984) is an American venture capitalist, philanthropist, and activist.

Early life 
Kluge is the son of the late billionaire John Kluge, founder of the media conglomerate Metromedia, and his wife, Patricia Kluge (née Patricia Maureen Rose), who adopted him in 1984 and raised him on their Charlottesville, Virginia estate, Albemarle House. He graduated from Phillips Academy in 2001 and Columbia University in 2005. He also has an MBA from the F. W. Olin Graduate School of Business of Babson College.

Biography 
After college, Kluge worked for several think tanks, including the anti-poverty think tank Rock and Wrap it Up, and the EastWest Institute, where he was made program coordinator for the institute's cybersecurity initiative.

Kluge founded Eirene, an angel investment firm that supports social causes and  provides consulting services on cause marketing and analytic giving. One of his investments is Fonderie 47, a social enterprise that recovers weapons from conflict zones and melts them down to produce luxury items such as watches and accessories. In 2012, he co-founded Toilet Hackers, a social enterprise   building sanitation projects in underdeveloped regions that lack adequate access to toilets. He also launched the first worldwide "Toilet Hackathon," in partnership with the World Bank and the Bill & Melinda Gates Foundation to gather entrepreneurs worldwide to brainstorm for global sanitation problems.

In 2018, he launched the Refugee Investment Network, a philanthropy that directs private capital to refugee entrepreneurs. It has secured more than $200 million in commitments as of 2018 and aims to mobilize at least $1 billion in investment by 2030.

Kluge serves as a trustee of Babson College and was a member of the Center for Strategic and International Studies's task force on global forced migration that was formed in 2017. He is  the author of two books: Charity & Philanthropy for Dummies (2013) and John Kluge: Stories (2015), published by Columbia University Press.

Personal life 
Kluge is married to Christine Mahoney, a professor of public policy and politics at the University of Virginia. The couple have co-founded the Alight Fund, an investment platform for refugee entrepreneurs.

Kluge inherited his father's estate in Virginia, but it was sold to The Trump Organization who previously purchased his mother's adjacent vineyard and winery operations that became the Trump Winery. In 2017, after President Donald Trump announced a tariff against Mexican products, Kluge raised $25,000 as a proposal for a flag-raising ceremony in front of the winery to celebrate Mexican-American partnership. In 2021, he helped launch the "truth farm," a public art installation dedicated to conversations about immigration, next to  the Trump family winery.

References 

Living people
1984 births
American philanthropists
American activists
Phillips Academy alumni
Columbia College (New York) alumni
People from Charlottesville, Virginia
American venture capitalists
Babson College alumni